João Cunha is a professional Brazilian Jiu-Jitsu practitioner.

Pan American Brazilian Jiu Jitsu Championship

Pan American NO-GI Championship

World NO-GI Championship

Brazilian National Jiu Jitsu Championship

International Masters e Seniors

International Masters e Seniors: No - Gi

American National Championship

American National NO-GI Championship

New York International Open Championship

Las Vegas International Open Championship

Mixed martial arts record

|-
| Win
|align=center| 2-0
|Toby Imada
|Submission (Armbar)
| Cage of Fire 5
| 
| align=center| 2
| align=center| 2:30
| Tijuana, Mexico
|
|-
| Win
|align=center| 1–0
|Steve Gomm
| Decision
|GC 5 - Rumble in the Rockies
|
|align=center|2
|align=center|5:00
|Denver, Colorado, United States
| Pro Debut.
|-

References

External links
Pitbull Jiu Jitsu Academy, San Diego, Ca
Myspace Page

Living people
Brazilian practitioners of Brazilian jiu-jitsu
Sportspeople from Rio de Janeiro (city)
Brazilian emigrants to the United States
Year of birth missing (living people)
21st-century Brazilian people